is a Japanese yonkoma manga series written and illustrated by Machiko Hasegawa. When the Asahi Shimbun wished to have Hasegawa draw the four-panel comic for their paper, she moved to Tokyo in 1949 with the explanation that the main characters had moved from Kyūshū to Tokyo as well. The first Sazae-san strip run by the Asahi Shimbun was published on November 30, 1949. The manga dealt with everyday life and contemporary situations in Tokyo until Hasegawa retired and ended the series, with the final comic published on February 21, 1974.

As of 1999, the manga had over 86 million copies in circulation, making it one of the best-selling manga series of all time. Sazae-san won the 8th Bungeishunjū Manga Award in 1962. An anime television adaptation by TCJ (later renamed Eiken) began airing in Japan in October 1969 and holds the Guinness World Record for the longest-running animated television series. It has also been adapted into a radio show, theatrical plays and songs.

Plot
In the beginning, Sazae was more interested in being with her horse than dressing up in kimono and makeup to attract her future husband. Hasegawa was forward-thinking in that, in her words, the Isono/Fuguta clan would embody the image of the modern Japanese family after World War II.

Sazae was a very liberated woman, and many of the early plotlines revolved around Sazae bossing around her husband, to the consternation of her neighbors, who believed that a man should be the head of his household. Later, Sazae became a feminist and was involved in many comical situations regarding her affiliation with her local women's lib group.

Despite the topical nature of the series, the core of the stories revolved around the large family dynamic, and were presented in a lighthearted, easy fashion. In fact, the final comic, in 1974, revolved around Sazae's happiness that an egg she cracked for her husband's breakfast produced a double yolk, with Katsuo remarking about the happiness the "little things" in life can bring.

In current culture, the popular Sazae-san anime is frequently viewed as a nostalgic representation of traditional Japanese society, since it represents a simpler time before many of the changes brought by modern technology. Its social themes, though very liberal at the time of its publication, are evocative of a bygone and nostalgic era.

Characters

Isono and Fuguta family
 (née )
 The main character. Age 24 (27 in the manga). She marrying Masuo.
 She is a housewife, but occasionally works part-time as a maid for the Yumizu family, a wealthy family in the neighborhood.
 She has a unique hair style. This is one of the Victory rolls that were popular at the time Manga was started, and she has maintained this hairstyle since the fad passed.
 She is bright, cheerful, and popular in the town with a personality like that of a split bamboo.
 Her talkativeness and goofiness are shortcomings, and she is sometimes taken aback by family, but most of the time she is well-liked by those around her.
Voiced by: Midori Katō (1969- )

 Sazae's father and patriarch of the family. Aged 54.
 He is characterized by a single hair on his bald head, and he is very protective of that single hair.
 He hates crookedness and can be stubborn, often scolding Sazae and Katsuo, but he also has a compassionate and good-natured side.
 He appears to be full of dignity and dignity, but in fact has an unreliable side.
 When he scolds, he often says,  (It means "Fool!") However, he does not really believe this, and in his heart of hearts, he has a love for his children, wanting them to grow up to be good people. This is also known as a famous line that symbolizes him.
Voiced by: Ichirō Nagai (1969–2014), Chafurin (2014–)

 (née )
 Sazae's mother. In her 50s (48 in the manga); born in Shizuoka.
 She is a stay-at-home mom and proud of her position. also, She does all the housework and is the epitome of a good wife and wise mother.
 She is calm and trusted by all of her family. She is an important behind-the-scenes supporter of the family, mediating domestic disputes.
 On the other hand, as a girl she was a tomboy, and this side of her personality is sometimes apparent.
Voiced by: Miyoko Asō (1969–2015), Yorie Terauchi (2015–)

 Sazae's husband. He is a salaryman in the sales department of a trading company. 28 years old (32 in the manga). Born  in Osaka. 
 After marrying Sazae, they lived together in a rented house, but were advised by the landlord to move out of the house due to misconduct (He tries to remove the fence of the house without permission), and soon moved in with her family.
 He is good-natured and timid, which can lead to a loss-making role, and he sometimes says and does things that one might consider black-hearted. However, his gentle and honest nature has earned him the trust of Sazae's family, and he himself lives happily every day surrounded by Sazae's family.
Voiced by: Shinsuke Chikaishi (1969–1978), Hiroshi Masuoka (1978–2019), Hideyuki Tanaka (2019—)

 Sazae's little brother who is an 11 year old fifth grader.
 He is quick-witted, well-spoken, and has a flattered personality. also, he knowing how to get on in the world and good with people. In Manga 1973, he was sarcastically referred to by Sazae as "the Kissinger of our family". but, he does not good at schoolwork and refuses to do his homework.
 He like mischief and often suffers under the wrath of Sazae, when accidentally insults other guests in the manner of faux-pas.
 he often scolded by Namihei, when usually finds out about Katsuo's low test grades and mischief.
 His main activity consists of playing baseball and soccer with his friends.
Voiced by: Nobuyo Ōyama (1969-1970), Kazue Takahashi (1970–1998), Miina Tominaga (1998–)

 Sazae's little sister. Age 9 (7 in the manga). She features a Bob cut.
 She is one of the characters whose personalities differ greatly between manga and anime.
 In Manga, she is a talkative girl with a noticeably mischievous personality due to her young age.
 In anime, she is a kind honor student. Therefore, her role in Manga is sometimes handled by Tarao, but sometimes she shows her mischievous nature as in Manga.
 She likes to study but is not good at PE. Her main hobbies are reading and fashion.
Voiced by: Yoshiko Yamamoto (1969–1976), Michiko Nomura (1976–2005), Makoto Tsumura (2005-)

 Sazae and Masuo's 3-year old son. Usually called . 
 He is interested in everything and has a curious nature.
 While a mostly well behaved toddler, he can be a bit stubborn.
 Sometimes he tries to be selfish and annoys Sazae and Masuo. However, he is a child who can honestly admit and apologize when he knows he is wrong.
 With anime, he is so polite and uses honorific that it is hard to believe he is 3 years old. This is said to reflect the character of Takako Sasuga, who played him from the beginning of the broadcast until her sudden death in 2023.
Voiced by: Takako Sasuga (1969—2023), Rikako Aikawa (2023-present)

The Isono family's pet cat. He hates mice.
Voiced by: ? Isono and Fuguta family's kin

 He is a nephew of Namihei and a cousin of Sazae, Katsuo, and Wakame. Ages 24-26. He works for a newspaper publisher.
 He is a cheerful character, an optimist who is always ready to take it easy, without worrying about details.
 He is also shrewd and has a brazen side, such as entering Isono family's house without telling them and eating the cakes they keep without permission, but he is not a hateful type of person, so he gets a lot out of life.Voiced by: Ichirō Murakoshi (1969–1998), Tarō Arakawa (1998–2000), Yasunori Matsumoto (2000–)

 Norisuke's wife. Age is about 22 years old.
 She is known as a particularly beautiful woman in anime and has a demure personality. She also has a strong core and supports Norisuke behind his back as his wife, and Norisuke cannot resist her.
 She is very comfortable with Sazae who are close in age.Voiced by: Ryoko Aikawa, Masako Ebisu (1969–1979), Emiko Tsukada (1979–2013), Sayaka Kobayashi (2013–)

 Norisuke and Taiko's son. Age is about one and a half years old.
 He is Tarao's friend and he just say Chan, Hai and Babuu.Voiced by: Reiko Katsura

 Namihei's Meiji Revolution samurai ancestor. Around the time of the Bon Festival, he haunts Namihei's (or sometimes Katsuo's) dreams.Voiced by: Ichirō Nagai (?–2013), Chafurin (2014–)

 Namihei's twin older brother.Voiced by: Ichirō Nagai (1970–2013), Chafurin (2014–)

Isasaka family

 A novelist who lives in the next house of Isono family's house.Voiced by: Eken Mine (1985–2002), Atsushi Ii (2002), Yasuo Iwata (2002–2009), Kōtarō Nakamura (2009–)

 Nanbutsu's wife. Fune's childhood friend.Voiced by: Reiko Yamada

 Nanbutsu's daughter.
 She is one of the characters that Katsuo is secretly in love with.Voiced by: Keiko Han (1985–1990), Miina Tominaga (1990–1998), Eriko Kawasaki (1998–)

 Nanbutsu's son.Voiced by: Hiroshi Takemura

 Isasaka family's pet dog.

Other characters

 An original anime character modeled after a guest character from Manga.
 An old man who lives in a house in back of (ura-no) Isono family's house.Voiced by: Eken Mine (1985–2002), Atsushi Ii (2002–2013), Mitsuru Takakuwa (2013–),

 An original anime character modeled after a guest character from Manga.
 Ura-no Grandpa's wife.Voiced by: Sumiko Shirakawa, Keiko Yamamoto, Reiko Yamada

 The employee of Mikawaya who makes house calls for food orders.
 An original anime character modeled after a guest character from Manga.Voiced by: Issei Futamata

 An original anime character.
 One of Tarao's friends.Voiced by: Reiko Katsura

 An original anime character.
 One of Tarao's friends.Voiced by: Reiko Yamada

 An original anime character modeled after a guest character from Manga.
 Katsuo's best friend and his classmate.Voiced by: Sumiko Shirakawa (1969–2015), Rumi Ochiai (2015–)

 An original anime character.
 One of Katsuo's classmates, she is said to be the most beautiful girl in her class.
 She is one of the characters that Katsuo is secretly in love with.Voiced by: Reiko Katsura

 One of Katsuo's classmates.
 She is one of the characters that Katsuo is secretly in love with.Voiced by: Keiko Han (1985–1990), Miina Tominaga (1990–1998), Eriko Kawasaki (1998–),

 An original anime character modeled after a guest character from Manga.
 One of Katsuo's classmates, who has a crush on him. She is the daughter of a real estate agent.
 Although katsuo is bewildered and avoids her ardent approach, they actually tend to get along quite well, as they often action together.Voiced by: Tikako Akimoto (1969–?), Tarako, Keiko Yamamoto (?–)

 An original anime character.
 One of Katsuo's classmates.Voiced by: Reiko Yamada

 An original anime character.
 One of Katsuo's classmates.Voiced by: Emiko Tsukada (?–2013), Sayaka Kobayashi (2014–)

 An original anime character.
 Katsuo's teacher.Voiced by: Eken Mine (?–2002), Sanji Hase (?), Ikuya Sawaki (2002–)

 An original anime character.
 One of Wakame's classmates.
 Since the 2010s, he has been described as a psychopathic speaker and has become an Internet meme in Japan. also, He used to be set up by Wakame as secretly liking him, but in recent years Wakame has sometimes made statements that seem to indicate that he dislikes him.Voiced by: Emiko Tsukada (?–2013), Sayaka Kobayashi (2014–)

 An original anime character.
 One of Wakame's classmates.Voiced by: Reiko Katsura

 An original anime character.
 One of Wakame's classmates.Voiced by: Reiko Katsura (?–1990), Miina Tominaga (1990–1998), Eriko Kawasaki (1998–),

 An original anime character modeled after a guest character from Manga.
 One of Masuo's co-workers. He has thick lips, which are his charm.Voiced by: Kazuya Tatekabe(–197?), Norio Wakamoto(197?–)Voiced by: Norio Wakamoto

 The shopkeeper of Mikawaya, a sake shop.Voiced by: Norio Wakamoto (?–?), Ikuya Sawaki (?–)

 An original anime character.
 Hanako's father. Boss of the Hanazawa Real Estate Agency.Voiced by: ?, Norio Wakamoto (?–)

Media
Manga
In April 1993, this publishing company went out of business and the comic books went out of print. The same year, Asahi Shimbun purchased the right to publish the forty-five paperback volumes. Twelve bilingual (Japanese-English) manga volumes were published by Kodansha between 1997 and 1999 as The Wonderful World of Sazae-San. The volumes were re-released in 2004, and in 2015 another three bilingual manga volumes were released as The Best of Sazae-san. By 1999, it has sold over 86 million copies.

Anime

In October 1969, Fuji Television started an anime series, which is still on the air today and currently in production, making it one of the longest-running scripted TV series in history and the longest running animated show. The broadcast time is every Sunday from 18:30 to 19:00 and has never been changed since its inception. The format is in the form of three vignettes. The anime series has some characters, like Katsuo's classmates, who have not appeared in Hasegawa's original works.

On September 5, 2013, This anime was awarded the Guinness World Record for the "Longest running animated TV series". The record continues to be broken even today, As of November 2021, there have been over 2250 episodes aired.

The story will be based on at least one episode of Machiko Hasegawa's manga, from which an original story developed. Due to the limited number of episodes, a new story is created every few years using the same episodes. In addition, the unique culture and events in a typical Japanese household, including the four seasons, will always be reflected in the story.

At the start of the anime, it was a slapstick comedy with references to Tom and Jerry, but within a year it had become a sedate family drama. From that point to the present, there has been no major change in style for more than 50 years, from directing, scriptwriting, and character design. For this reason, it is often described as a "national anime" in Japan and is regarded as a symbol of "universality" and "permanence". Whenever there is a change, such as a change in voice actors, there is always a great deal of media coverage, and the anime retains a strong influence on the public.

In recent years, due to the influence of its unchanging style, it is sometimes criticized as "anachronistic" or "this anime depicts the 20th century," such as the absence of smartphones and convenience stores in the work even though the period setting is the present day. In response to this comment, the staff said, "The appeal of this anime is that it depicts scenes of everyday life and universal relationships that can be found in any family. Therefore, we have no plans in the future to incorporate events or items that would change them." He responded. However, some of the phenomena, such as smoking and corporal punishment, which have come to be considered inappropriate due to changing times, have been removed or otherwise addressed.

The anime is not well known outside of Japan, as it has never been exported overseas or otherwise developed globally due to the wishes of the rights holders. However, in 2019, the producer said in a conversation that he hopes to be able to expand globally in the future.

As for voice actors, as of 2023, only Midori Katō, who plays Sazae, has never been changed. Katō was recognized by Guinness World Records in 2019 as the "Longest career as a voice actor for the same character of an animated TV series". As of 2008, 40 years after the broadcast, four of the seven main characters were original cast members, but in 2014 Ichirō Nagai, who played Namihei, was replaced due to his sudden death at age 82, and the following year Miyoko Asō, who played Fune, was changed to reflect her age at 89. Takako Sasuga, who played Tarao, died suddenly in 2023 at the age of 87 and was replaced.

The opening is an introduction to the places that Sazae has traveled and visited throughout Japan since 1974. This video changes approximately every three months. Because of the popularity of the anime, this has come to be viewed by cities as a "cost-effective means of promoting tourism," and since 2000, the program has received approximately 5-10 million yen in aid from prefectures and municipalities wishing to introduce the program.

Since November 1991, after the closing credits and the next episode previews, each show has ended with a janken match between Sazae and the viewers at home, in which Sazae holds up a sign representing one of the appropriate hand gestures. From 1969 until October 1991, Sazae ended each episode by tossing a bean or rice cake in the air and catching it in her mouth. Fuji Television switched to the janken match after doctors at Tohoku University Hospital and the National Center for Child Health and Development raised concerns that children may try to imitate Sazae and potentially choke on food.

The anime series was originally sponsored solely by Toshiba—Later, in 1998, the program expanded to other sponsors, but the unity between Toshiba and Sazae-san remained strong. So when Toshiba withdrew its sponsorship due to poor management, it was big news.Sazae-san was the last animated television series to use traditional cel animation, although as of April 2009, the opening credits were digital; the series finally switched to fully digital animation in 2013. Despite the series being a hit, Hasegawa stated that she never wanted any merchandise to be made for it, including home video rights, making availability of past episodes, especially those prior to the introduction of the VCR, very rare. Following her death, her request to prohibit older episodes from being released in home media was honored. Despite this however, Fuji TV made an agreement with Amazon Prime Video in December 2018 to release the 1969 and early-to-mid 1970s episodes available on their streaming service. The episodes from the mid 2000s happened to also be on the service.

The Opening Song and Ending Song are original songs sung by Yuko Uno from the start. Also, the audio itself has not been altered in any way, such as by arrangement, although it was trimmed to fit the length of the video in the early stages of the broadcast.

There have been two previous suspensions of animation production: the first, for about a month beginning in February 1975, due to the 1970s energy crisis; the second, for about a month beginning in May 2020, due to COVID-19. Programming during these periods was handled by rebroadcasting past productions.

In Japan, there is a term called "Sazae-san syndrome" (サザエさん症候群, Sazae-san shōkōgun), which refers to a depressed mood on Sunday night after an episode has finished on television, reminding people that the weekend is coming to an end.

Live-action
In 1955, a radio station aired a serial drama based on the comic strip.

The same year, a short-lived live-action television series was started, and was aired on what is now TBS.

In November 1965, TBS started a dramatic television series modeled after the comic strip. It aired until September 1967.

In 1979, NHK made a dramatic serial which ran for six months, focusing on the creation of Sazae-san and Machiko Hasegawa in her younger days.

The series is patterned after the anime series and uses the same elements, including the theme music and the closing janken match.

Commercials
In 2008, Glico showed the family in the "25 years later" commercials, as adults, for the firms "Otona Glico" chocolates. The characters were portrayed by Eita (as Fuguta Tarao), Tadanobu Asano (as Isono Katsuo), Rie Miyazawa (as Isono Wakame) and Shun Oguri (as Namino Ikura). In 2017, the characters Sazae and Masao were depicted in a Cup Noodles commercial drawn by Katsuya Kondō.

See also
 List of anime series by episode count for a full list of lengthy anime.
 Anpanman Chibi Maruko-chan Crayon Shin-chan Doraemon Nintama Rantarō Ojarumaru''

Notes

References

External links
 
 
 

1946 comics debuts
1946 manga
1969 anime television series debuts
1974 comics endings
Japanese children's animated comedy television series
Animated sitcoms
Comedy anime and manga
Comics adapted into animated series
Comics adapted into plays
Comics adapted into radio series
Comics adapted into television series
Comics characters introduced in 1946
Comics set in Tokyo
Eiken (studio)
Fuji TV original programming
Josei manga
Slice of life anime and manga
Television shows based on comic strips
Works originally published in Asahi Shimbun
Yonkoma
Anime postponed due to the COVID-19 pandemic
Anime productions suspended due to the COVID-19 pandemic